The modern pentathlon at the 1992 Summer Olympics was represented by two events (both for men): Individual competition and Team competition. As usual in Olympic modern pentathlon, one competition was held and each competitor's score was included to the Individual competition event results table and was also added to his teammates' scores to be included to the Team competition event results table. This competition consisted of 5 disciplines:

 Fencing, held on July 26 at the Palau de la Metal-lúrgia
 Swimming, held on July 27 at the Piscines Bernat Picornell
Shooting, held on July 27 at the Camp de Tir Olímpic de Mollet
Running, held on July 28 at Circuit de Cros
Equestrian held on July 29 at the Real Club de Polo

Participating nations
A total of 66 athletes from 30 nations competed at the Barcelona Games:

Medal summary

Medal table

References

External links
Official Olympic Report

 
1992 Summer Olympics events